Ogiyenko is a Russian last name, a variant of Ageyev. However, unlike "Ageyev", which derives from the first name Aggey, this last name, as well as its variant Ogishin (masculine)/Ogishina (feminine) (/), derive either from the first name "Ogiy", which is the Ukrainian form of "Aggey", or from its derivative "Ogisha".

People with the last name
Denis Ogienko (Ogiyenko), bronze medal winner in the half-middleweight men's judo event at the 2003 Summer Universiade
Valentina Ogienko (Ogiyenko) (b. 1965), Soviet Olympic volleyball player
Yegor Ogiyenko, Russian ice hockey player selected in Round 3 of the 2013 KHL Junior Draft

References

Notes

Sources
И. М. Ганжина (I. M. Ganzhina). "Словарь современных русских фамилий" (Dictionary of Modern Russian Last Names). Москва, 2001. 

Russian-language surnames
